The Stazione Sperimentale per i Combustibili (SSC) (Fuel Experimental Station) is a special Agency of the Chamber of Commerce in Milan.
It is an Institute for applied research, established in Milan in 1940 replacing the Politecnico di Milano Fuel Section, and operating on a national scale with the specific aim of promoting the technical and technological progress in the fossil fuels and derived products industry. In 1999 SSC was transformed into a public economic institution with important legal, operational and administrative modifications which, however, have left its mission and functions unchanged.

See also
Stazione Sperimentale per le Industrie degli Oli e dei Grassi
Stazione Sperimentale per la Seta
Stazione Sperimentale Carta, Cartoni e Paste per Carta

References

External links
Homepage of the SSC 

Experimental Stations for Industry in Italy
Economy of Milan
Organizations established in 1940
1940 establishments in Italy